The Girls of Hedsor Hall is an MTV reality TV series similar to Ladette to Lady and VH1's Charm School. The series takes 12 out of control American girls to Hedsor House, a filming, wedding, conference and events venue in the United Kingdom. There a finishing school called Hedsor Hall (aka Hedsor House) was created where they will try to become ladies. The girl who improves the most will receive the Hedsor Trust which is worth $100,000.

Contestants

 Host: Tara Conner
 Headmistress: Gill Harbord
 Disciplinarian: Rosemary Shrager
 Housemaid:  Dina Lees

Episode Progress

 The contestant won The Girls of Hedsor Hall.
 The contestant was Runner Up.
 The contestant won the week's challenge.
 The contestant was safe from expulsion.
 The contestant was at risk for expulsion.
 The contestant was at risk for expulsion, but was told she won the challenge.
 The contestant was expelled.
 The contestant was expelled outside of The Student Board of Review.
 The contestant was expelled without being at risk for expulsion.

Episodes

Episode 1: "Assessment and Appearance"
First aired February 9, 2009

Challenge: Behavior at a Cocktail Party
Bottom Three: Margie, Amanda, Jenna
Expelled: Amanda
Reason: Mrs. Shrager, Ms. Harbord and Ms. Conner all felt that Amanda's constant fighting and cursing was disruptive. Plus when Mrs. Shrager woke everyone up that morning and shockingly saw that Amanda was covered in a mess of makeup, she asked Amanda what she looked like, to which Amanda rudely replied, "I look like I'm in a lot of fucking pain right now," causing Mrs. Shrager to become infuriated.

Episode 2: "Etiquette"First aired February 25, 2009Challenge: Etiquette (in Balance, Art, Flower Arranging, Conversation Skills, Wine Tasting, and Behavior in a Luncheon)
Challenge Winner: Kimberly (in Flower Arranging)
Challenge Prize: The flower arrangement will be put on the Lucheon table
Bottom Three: Brianna, Samantha, and Maddy
Expelled: Maddy & Lillian (Eliminated outside of the Student Board Of Review)
Reason':  Lillian refused to come to her classes, causing Mrs. Shrager and Ms Harbord to step forward and demand answers from her. Ms. Harbord asked Lillian to define "respect" to which she replied that she's "not a dictionary," making her expelled instantly. Maddy overly drank at her Wine Tasting Lesson, until she reached up to the point of telling the girls that she wanted to go home and eventually told her teachers, making her eliminated.

Episode 3: "Expanding Horizons"First aired February 28, 2009Challenge: Expanding One's Horizon (in Behavior in National Breakfast, Falconry, Plucking pheasants, Hosting or Cooking for a Dinner and Behavior at a Dinner)
Challenge Winner: Margie (in Falconry)
Challenge Prize: A Badge
Bottom Three: Jen, Jenna, Margie
Expelled: Jen
Reason: Jen offered her prescriptive drugs to her roommates. Plus, she kept talking during her breakfast lesson, causing Mrs. Shrager to tell her to shut up. She also cried and freaked out during the pheasant shoot and when she plucked the pheasants.

Episode 4: "Anger Management"First aired March 7, 2009Challenge: Anger Management (in Criticism, Fencing, Cooking, and behavior around men)
Challenge Winner: Kimberly (in fencing)
Challenge Prize: A call home
Bottom Three: Hillary, Paola, Brianna
Expelled: Margie & Jennifer
Reason: When the girls were going out to eat at a local restaurant, Ms. Harbord criticized Margie's outfit, by saying its inappropriate. Initially, Margie started to cry and she stormed out, leaving the girls to go to dinner without her. Jennifer had been told more than once by Mrs. Shrager to remove her makeup and when Mrs. Shrager noticed that her makeup was on once again during cooking, she crossed the line, and yelled at Jennifer to get out of the kitchen and take off her makeup.

Episode 5: "Country Weekend"First aired March 14, 2009Challenge: Temptation (in Sexual Etiquette, Waltzing, Hostessing and behavior at Hedsor Hall alone)
Challenge Winner: Samantha (in Waltzing)
Challenge Prize: A free pass during elimination, meaning that she couldn't get eliminated
Bottom: Everyone was at risk this week.
Expelled: Paola
Reason: Paola failed as a Hostess. She constantly excused herself out of dinner, leaving her bachelor all alone.

Episode 6: "Job Training"First aired March 21, 2009Challenge: Job Training (Cooking and working at a London Hotel)
Challenge Winner: Hillary (in Cooking)
Challenge Prize: Leader
Bottom: Everyone was at risk this week.
Expelled: Jenna
Reason: Jenna lied to the hotel manager during her interview, by saying no, when she was asked if she've been in jail. At the hotel, she and Brianna took over 2 hours cleaning one room, when the hotel manager needed 20 rooms cleaned. Infuriated by this, Jenna told the manager off, and left.

Episode 7: "Reflection"First aired March 28, 2009Challenge: Reflection (in disciplining women who act exactly the same as the contestants when they first came here)
Challenge Winner: No One
Challenge Prize: Nothing
Bottom: Everyone was at risk this week.
Expelled: Hillary
Reason: Hillary failed her Appearance lesson, by not managing to make the UK girls wear something more appropriate and suitable. Initially, Samantha had to take charge of Hillary's lesson and made the UK girls change into more appropriate clothes.

Episode 8: "The Trust"First aired April 4, 2009''

Challenge:
Challenge Winner: No One
Challenge Prize: Nothing
Bottom: Everyone was at risk this week.
Expelled: Samantha
Reason: Mrs. Shrager, Ms. Harbord and Ms. Conner felt that she wasn't as good as Kimberly and Brianna.
Graduates (Final 2): Brianna and Kimberly
Winner: Kimberly
Runner Up: Brianna

References

External links
 The Girls of Hedsor Hall at MTV.com
 The Girls of Hedsor Hall at IAmOnMTV.com

2000s American reality television series
2009 American television series debuts
2009 American television series endings
MTV reality television series
Television series by Banijay